Lennie Clements (born January 20, 1957) is an American professional golfer.

Clements was born in Cherry Point, North Carolina. He played college golf at San Diego State University where he was a three-time All-American. He was inducted into the San Diego State Aztec Hall of Fame in 1999.

Clements turned professional in 1980. He played on the PGA Tour from  1981 to 1998. His best finish was a T-2 at the 1994 Bob Hope Chrysler Classic. His best finish in a major was a T-9 at the 1987 U.S.Open. He also played a few events on the Ben Hogan Tour in 1991 and 1992, winning at the 1992 Ben Hogan Greater Ozarks Open.

Amateur wins (2)
1979 California State Amateur, Southwestern Amateur

Professional wins (4)

Ben Hogan Tour wins (1)

Ben Hogan Tour playoff record (1–0)

Other wins (3)
1982 Timex Open
1983 Sahara Nevada Open
1988 Spalding Invitational

Results in major championships

CUT = missed the half-way cut
"T" = tied

Summary

Most consecutive cuts made – 5 (1984 U.S. Open – 1987 U.S. Open)
Longest streak of top-10s – 1

See also
1984 PGA Tour Qualifying School graduates
1989 PGA Tour Qualifying School graduates
1992 PGA Tour Qualifying School graduates

References

External links

American male golfers
San Diego State Aztecs men's golfers
PGA Tour golfers
Golfers from North Carolina
People from Cherry Point, North Carolina
Golfers from San Diego
1957 births
Living people